Charles Johnson DeLand (December 18, 1879January 10, 1943) was a Michigan politician.

Early life
Charles J. DeLand was born in Saginaw, Michigan, on December 18, 1879, to parents Charles Victor Deland and Mary Elizabeth Deland.

Education
DeLand was educated at Michigan Agricultural College. DeLand began studying law in 1900.

Career
In 1905, DeLand was admitted to the bar. DeLand served as chair of Jackson County Republican Party from 1906 to 1910. DeLand served as a delegate to the Michigan state constitutional convention representing the 10th district from 1907 to 1908. On November 3, 1914, DeLand was elected to the Michigan Senate where he represented the 10th district from January 6, 1915, to December 31, 1920. DeLand served as the Michigan Secretary of State from 1921 to 1926. On November 6, 1928, DeLand was elected to the Michigan House of Representatives where he represented the Wayne County 1st district from January 2, 1929, to December 31, 1930. In 1934 and 1940, DeLand was defeated when attempting to be re-elected to the state house. In 1932, DeLand was an unsuccessful candidate in the Republican primary for United States House of Representatives seat representing Michigan's 15th congressional district. DeLand was a delegate to Republican National Convention from Michigan in 1936.

Personal life
DeLand married Jessie Alice Hutchins on September 26, 1905. DeLand was a member of the Freemasons.

Death
DeLand died on January 10, 1943, in Detroit, Michigan. DeLand was interred at Woodland Cemetery in Jackson, Michigan, on January 12, 1943.

References

1879 births
1943 deaths
American Freemasons
Burials in Michigan
Michigan lawyers
Politicians from Saginaw, Michigan
Politicians from Jackson, Michigan
Michigan State University alumni
Secretaries of State of Michigan
Republican Party Michigan state senators
Republican Party members of the Michigan House of Representatives
20th-century American politicians
20th-century American lawyers